The Singapore Chess Federation (Abbreviation: SCF) is the principal authority over all chess events in Singapore, and was founded in 1949 by Lim Kok Ann. Its promotion of the game has caused participation in its youth and interschool events, among others, to jump from 517 in 1999 to over 1200 in 2004.  As a result, Singapore has one of the highest number of chess players in schools per capita in Asia.  The Federation is affiliated to the world governing body, International Chess Federation (FIDE), and is part of the ASEAN Chess Confederation and the Asian Chess Federation.

The current President is Dr Hsu Li Yang (who is also an International Master).

The current Vice President is Dr Wong Meng Kong (who is a Grandmaster).

See also
Singaporean Chess Championship

References

External links
 

National members of the Asian Chess Federation
Chess in Singapore
Chess
1949 establishments in Singapore
Sports organizations established in 1949
Chess organizations
1949 in chess